Anarestan (also Romanized as Anārestān and Anarstan) is a village in Baz Kia Gurab Rural District, in the Central District of Lahijan County, Gilan Province, Iran. At the 2006 census, its population was 419, in 127 families.

References 

Populated places in Lahijan County